Cheliosea is a genus of tiger moths in the family Erebidae described by Watson in 1980. The moths in the genus are found in Australia.

Species
 Cheliosea cosmeta (Lower, 1907)

Unknown status
 Cheliosea xanthotypa, described as Heliocaes xanthotypa Turner, 1940 from northern Australia is a species inquirenda.

References

External links

Spilosomina
Moth genera